Live in São Paulo is a live album by guitarist/vocalist Richie Kotzen. This is the first official live album by Kotzen and was recorded live in São Paulo, Brazil.

Track listing

Bootlegged In Brazil
The Japanese edition was released with different cover, songs in distinct order and the tracks "Losin' My Mind", "Go Faster" and "Don't Ask" instead of "Remember", "Fooled Again" and "Faith".

Track listing

This version also features a bonus DVD including the live performances of "Losin' My Mind", "Fooled Again", "So Cold", "Remember" and "Doin' What The Devil Says To Do".

Personnel
Richie Kotzen – lead vocals, guitar
Johnny Griparic – bass guitar
Dan Potruch – drums

References
 http://www.allmusic.com/album/live-in-sao-paulo-mw0001673905

Richie Kotzen albums
2008 live albums